Sa'id 'Abd al-Latif Foudah is a Shafi'i-Ash'ari academic working in Islamic theology (kalam), logic, legal theory (usul al-fiqh), and a prolific polemicist best known for his criticism of Ibn Arabi and his school, as well as the Salafi-Wahhabi movement, Ibn Taymiyya (d. 728/1328) and his followers.

Birth 
He was born in 1967 in the Jordanian town of al-Karameh, but his family originates from the Palestinian city of Haifa, from the village of Bayt Dajan.

Education 
He holds bachelor's and master's degrees in 'aqidah (Islamic creed) from the University of Jordan, and a PhD from the World Islamic Sciences and Education University, and is fluent in Arabic, English, and Italian. He also has a bachelor's degree in electrical engineering from the Jordan University of Science and Technology.

Teachers 
He was trained in the sciences of tafsir, tajwid, tasawwuf, and kalam, under scholars throughout the Middle East, including Nuh al-Qudah, 'Ali Gum'a, Sa'id al-'Anbatawi, and Ahmad al-Jamal of the Shadhiliyya tariqa in Jordan, among many others.

Views 
In his commentary on the al-'Aqida al-Tahawiyya (the creed of al-Tahawi), he criticizes the Wahhabi scholar Ibn Baz (d. 1420/1999) for an erroneous critique of the “people of kalam.” Foudah asserts: “The sole intention of Ibn Baz... was to oppose the scholars of kalam, even if with falsehood.” Elsewhere in his commentary, Foudah asserts the vital importance of studying the articles of belief in Islam, stating: “'Aqidah is sought after for itself, not only because it is a condition for the validity of actions. Even if an action is not obligatory, 'aqidah is still necessary, for it is the foundation of everything.”

In another treatise entitled “Critiquing A Critique,” Foudah refutes Ibn Taymiyya's claims that the study of logic is forbidden in Islam and defends al-Ghazali's statement that logic is the basis of all sciences. In yet another treatise by Foudah, he responds to the infamous speech on the subject of faith and reason given by Pope Benedict XVI in September 2006. The Pope offended many in the Muslim world by repeating a quote by a medieval Christian scholar that referred to the teachings of the Islamic prophet Muhammad as “evil and inhumane” and being “spread by the sword.” Foudah devoted his treatise to the Pope's remarks regarding Islam's relationship with reason, stating: “The Pope wants to say that the view of the Church in regards to Allah is in conformity with reason, but the view of Muslims with regards to this is contrary to reason! These are words which cause in us shock, laughter and bewilderment.” 

According to Jeffry R. Halverson, the Pope's narrow characterization of Islam's conception of God reflects only the Islam of the Atharis, and not at all the theological doctrines of the Ash'aris and Maturidis. This point is not lost on Foudah, who laments the demise of theology and other rational sciences that once flourished in the Islamic world, stating: 

In another treatise entitled “Modern Salafism and its Effect on Muslim Disunity,” Foudah notes the detrimental effects that Salafi thought has had on the Muslim world. He also recounts a series of systematic refutations or polemics against Salafi beliefs, writing:

Works 
His books and treatises are numerous, most of them in the science of 'aqidah, kalam (Islamic scholastic theology), logic and in response to philosophers and secularists and to those who he considers as mubtadi'a (heretical innovators) such as Ibn Taymiyya and his followers, particularly the Wahhabi movement.

He has authored and edited over eighty books and articles on almost every topic of Islamic systematic theology. Among his notable publications are the following:
 Al-Sharh al-Kabir 'ala al-'Aqida al-Tahawiyya, a commentary on al-'Aqida al-Tahawiyya in over 1450 pages and 2 volumes.
 Fatḥ al-Wadūd, a refutation of the teachings of Ibn Arabi as contained in the writings of al-Sayyid al-Sharif al-Jurjani. 
 Al-Kashif al-Saghir 'An 'Aqa'id Ibn Taymiyya, regarding the creed of Ibn Taymiyya. He dedicated this work to Fakhr al-Din al-Razi (d. 606/1210) and Muhammad Zahid al-Kawthari (d. 1371/1951).
 Risalatan fi Wahdat al-Wujud, a refutation of the teachings of Ibn Arabi, which expands upon the refutation in "Fatḥ al-Wadūd".
 Munāqashāt wa Rudūd Maʿa al-Shaykh ʿAbd al-Ghanī al-Nābulsī, a refutation of the teachings of Ibn Arabi as found in the works of ʿAbd al-Ghanī al-Nābulsī, which further expands upon the refutation found in Foudah's previous anti-Ibn Arabi output.
 Naqd al-Risala al-Tadmuriyya, critique of Ibn Taymiyya's work on creed. Translated into English by Suraqah Abdul Aziz.
Translated into English by Suraqah Abdul Aziz.
 Tad'im al-Mantiq, in support of the science of logic.
 Misbah al-Arwah fi Usul al-Din, editing of al-Baydawi's work on scholastic theology.
 Muljimat al-Mujassima, editing of 'Ala' al-Din al-Bukhari's work against Ibn Taymiyya.
 Masa'il al-Ikhtilaf bayna al-Asha'ira wa al-Maturidiyya, commentary on Ibn Kamal Pasha's work about the differences between the Ash'aris and the Maturidis in theology, in which Foudah succinctly explains the causes of the disagreements and their levels. Translated into English by Suraqah Abdul Aziz.

Notes

See also

References

External links 
 
 Sa'id Foudah's page on Goodreads
 Sa'id Foudah's profile on Islamic & Strategic Studies Institute (ISSI)

1967 births
Living people
21st-century Muslim theologians
Asharis
Shafi'is
Religion academics
Muslim reformers
Critics of Ibn Taymiyya
Critics of Wahhabism
Critics of atheism
Sunni Muslim scholars of Islam
People from Jaffa
Jordanian people of Palestinian descent